In physics, the thermal de Broglie wavelength (sometimes also denoted by ) is roughly the average de Broglie wavelength of particles in an ideal gas at the specified temperature. When the thermal de Broglie wavelength is much smaller than the interparticle distance, the gas can be considered to be a classical or Maxwell–Boltzmann gas. On the other hand, when the thermal de Broglie wavelength is on the order of or larger than the interparticle distance, quantum effects will dominate and the gas must be treated as a Fermi gas or a Bose gas, depending on the nature of the gas particles. The critical temperature is the transition point between these two regimes, and at this critical temperature, the thermal wavelength will be approximately equal to the interparticle distance. That is, the quantum nature of the gas will be evident for

i.e., when the interparticle distance is less than the thermal de Broglie wavelength; in this case the gas will obey Bose–Einstein statistics or Fermi–Dirac statistics, whichever is appropriate. This is for example the case for electrons in a typical metal at T = 300 K, where the electron gas obeys Fermi–Dirac statistics, or in a Bose–Einstein condensate. On the other hand, for

i.e., when the interparticle distance is much larger than the thermal de Broglie wavelength, the gas will obey Maxwell–Boltzmann statistics. Such is the case for molecular or atomic gases at room temperature, and for thermal neutrons produced by a neutron source.

Massive particles
For massive, non-interacting particles, the thermal de Broglie wavelength can be derived from the calculation of the partition function. Assuming a 1-dimensional box of length , the partition function (using the energy states of the 1D particle in a box) is

Since the energy levels are extremely close together, we can approximate this sum as an integral:

Hence,

This can also be expressed using the reduced Planck constant  as

Massless particles

For massless (or highly relativistic) particles, the thermal wavelength is defined as

where c is the speed of light. As with the thermal wavelength for massive particles, this is of the order of the average wavelength of the particles in the gas and defines a critical point at which quantum effects begin to dominate. For example, when observing the long-wavelength spectrum of black body radiation, the classical Rayleigh–Jeans law can be applied, but when the observed wavelengths approach the thermal wavelength of the photons in the black body radiator, the quantum Planck's law must be used.

General definition

A general definition of the thermal wavelength for an ideal gas of particles having an arbitrary power-law relationship between energy and momentum (dispersion relationship), in any number of dimensions, can be introduced. If  is the number of dimensions, and the relationship between energy () and momentum () is given by

where  is the Gamma function. Note that for massive non-relativistic particles (s = 2), the expression does not depend on n. This explains why the 1-D derivation above agrees with the 3-D case.

Examples
Some examples of the thermal de Broglie wavelength at 298 K are given below.

References

 Vu-Quoc, L., Configuration integral (statistical mechanics), 2008. this wiki site is down; see this article in the web archive on 2012 April 28.

Statistical mechanics